The Grenville ministry was a British Government headed by George Grenville which served between 16 April 1763 and 13 July 1765. It was formed after the previous Prime Minister, the Earl of Bute, had resigned following fierce criticism of his signing of the Treaty of Paris with its perceived lenient terms for France and Spain despite Britain's successes in the Seven Years War. Grenville's government was made up largely of the same members as Bute's had. George III had a violent dislike of the new government because of his resentment of the way they had replaced his favourite Bute.

During its two years, the Ministry confronted growing discontent in Britain's American colonies which were to lead to the American War of Independence breaking out in 1775. The Ministry also had to deal with the antics of John Wilkes.

The King's violent dislike of Grenville eventually forced him to dismiss him as first minister and replaced him with the Marquess of Rockingham, whom he hated almost equally.

Ministry

References

 
 
 

British ministries
Government
1763 establishments in Great Britain
1765 disestablishments in Great Britain
1760s in Great Britain
Ministries of George III of the United Kingdom